The A24 is a major road in Northern Ireland running from Belfast to Clough near Newcastle, passing through Carryduff and Ballynahinch. In Belfast, the route forms the Ormeau Road. At Clough it meets the A2.

The section of the A24 from Forestside Shopping Centre to Carryduff roundabout was named by European Road Assessment Programme  (EuroRAP) as one of the six most dangerous sections of road in Northern Ireland in 2005. This part of the road is a four-lane undivided carriageway.

Plans
There are plans to build a by-pass of the A24 around Ballynahinch, which is currently a bottleneck for strategic traffic resulting in traffic congestion.  This is exacerbated during Easter and Summer holidays with large volumes of traffic travelling to/from Newcastle and the wider Mournes area. The Department for Infrastructure has announced its intention to proceed with the scheme, with the start of construction subject to the funding of £35-45m being made available.

References

Roads in Northern Ireland
Roads in Belfast
Roads in County Down